The Tupolev ANT-29 (military designation DIP – Dvukhmotorny istrebitel pushechny, "twin-engined cannon fighter") was a 1930s twin-engined, cannon-armed fighter designed by Alexander Arkhangelsky and built by Tupolev.

Design work started in 1932 on a twin-engined aircraft capable of carrying two APK-100 cannon. The resulting design was the ANT-29 and it first flew in February 1935.It was a monoplane with a tall and narrow fuselage, powered by two Hispano-Suiza 12Ybrs engines. The cannon were mounted at the bottom of the fuselage, and unusually they were accessible to the crew in flight for loading and maintenance. During tests the machine had reasonable performance but was longitudinally unstable. The aircraft did not enter production.

Specifications

References

Notes

Bibliography

 

1930s Soviet fighter aircraft
ANT-29
Low-wing aircraft
Aircraft first flown in 1935
Twin piston-engined tractor aircraft